Clare Eames (August 5, 1894 – November 8, 1930) was an American actress and stage director, and the first wife of playwright Sidney Howard.

Early years
Eames was born August 5, 1894 in Hartford, Connecticut, the daughter of Clare (Hamilton) and Hayden Eames. Her maternal grandfather was Maryland governor and senator William Thomas Hamilton. Her aunt was American soprano Emma Eames.

Eames' family moved to Cleveland, Ohio when she was 11 years old. From there, she went to Paris to live with her aunt and studied drama. She attended the American Academy of Dramatic Arts.

Career 

In 1919, Eames joined the repertory theatre headed by Ethel Barrymore.

After World War I, Eames was considered one of the leading new female lights of the Broadway stage, performing classical roles in plays by Shakespeare and George Bernard Shaw. She made her stage debut in 1918. As a virtual unknown on Broadway, she won acclaim for her performance as the young Princess Elizabeth in a 1920 stage adaptation of Mark Twain's The Prince and the Pauper. After her starring role in John Drinkwater's one-act play Mary Stuart (1921), Eames quickly rose to the top rank in the American theatre.

Eames made a handful of silent pictures, but died before having the opportunity to appear in sound films.

Personal life 
Eames was engaged to Lieutenant Philip Livingston Rose, who was killed in action on October 6, 1918.

In 1922 Eames married playwright Sidney Howard. He divorced her in March 1930 after she had moved to England. He was awarded custody of their young daughter Clare, later known as Jennifer Howard.

Death 
She died November 8, 1930 at a hospital in Richmond, London, England, following surgery. She was 36.

Theatre credits

Filmography

References

External links

Portrait of Clare Eames(NY Public Library Billy Rose Collection)
Clare Eames in the Mary Pickford film Dorothy Vernon of Haddon Hall (University of Washington, Sayre collection)

1894 births
1930 deaths
Actresses from Hartford, Connecticut
American stage actresses
American silent film actresses
20th-century American actresses